DeSoto Falls is a  waterfall located on the West Fork of the Little River near Mentone, Alabama, in DeSoto State Park.  The falls have carved their own small canyon. They are named after Spanish explorer Hernando de Soto.

External links
DeSoto State Park, Alabama
DeSoto and Other Alabama Waterfalls

Landforms of DeKalb County, Alabama
Lookout Mountain
Waterfalls of Alabama